Christianity.com is a site owned and operated by Salem Web Network and headquartered in Richmond, Virginia. The stated focus of Christianity.com is to provide Christian content and interactive tools to help people understand Christianity.  Pastors, authors, and speakers such as John F. MacArthur, Adrian Rogers, Kay Arthur, Chuck Swindoll, Hank Hanegraaff, and John Piper contribute to the site.

History
In 1999, Christianity.com was originally headquartered in Silicon Valley, California. Spencer Jones from Christian Broadcasting Network (who invested $10 million in the startup) and David Davenport, who was head of Pepperdine University for 10 years, served as COO and CEO. Other funding and credit partners are Sequoia Capital, which invested $10 million, and Comdisco Ventures Group, which loaned $10 million for equipment and services. In the middle of the dotcom bust, the company went bankrupt and on December 18, 2001, the domain name was purchased by Renewal Enterprises, LLC.

Salem Web Network announced the acquisition of Christianity.com from Renewal Enterprises on February 11, 2005 for approximately $3.4 million.

Biblestudytools.com
Christianity.com's sister site, Biblestudytools.com, offers bible browsing functionality, search functions, and other study tools.

References

External links
ChristianityToday.com , February 2, 2001

Christian websites
Salem Media Group properties